The Saitama City Cup is an International friendly football tournament held in Saitama, Saitama Prefecture, Japan. It has been hosted by Urawa Red Diamonds annually since 2003 at Saitama Stadium 2002 until 2008 edition. 2009 event was also planned and announced but cancelled later due to 2009 flu pandemic. 2010 and 2011 edition were hosted by Omiya Ardija thus held at NACK5 Stadium Ōmiya. After absence in 2012, 2013 event will be hosted by Urawa again and Arsenal F.C. will be non-Japanese invitees, while previous edition in 2011 was competed by Omiya and Urawa, without non-Japanese invitees first time.

Matches

2022 international club friendly

2020 international club friendly

2017 international club friendly

2013 international club friendly

2011 international club friendly

2010 Surprise Cup

2008 Phonna Cup

2007 Mohan Cup

2006 Saitama City Cup

2005 Saitama City Cup

2004 Saitama City Cup

2003 Saitama City Cup 

Japanese football friendly trophies
Urawa Red Diamonds
Omiya Ardija
Sport in Saitama (city)
2003 establishments in Japan